Helen Bennett may refer to:
Helen Bennett, British woman who was a victim of the 2005 Kuşadası minibus bombing
Helen Bennett (journalist), American journalist, manager of the Chicago Collegiate Bureau of Occupations, envisioner of the Woman's World's Fair
Helen Bennett (presenter), British television presenter, see The Wall Game
Helen Cutaran Bennett (1911– ), Foreign Secretary of the Philippine Republic under President Elpidio Quirino
Mother-1 of the Bionix Six